5150 Elm's Way is a 2009 French-language Canadian psychological thriller drama film directed by 
Éric Tessier and starring René-Daniel Dubois and Marc-André Grondin. It is based on a novel with the same name, written by author Patrick Senécal.

Plot
Elm's Way is a calm street in a small town. When Yannick falls from his bike, he knocks on the door of the Beaulieu residence, to call a cab home. Entering the house, Yannick hears a man screaming upstairs. When he finally encounters the source of the screams  he realizes that Beaulieu has wounded the man and was holding him hostage. Beaulieu then locks down Yannick in fear of him calling the police. Over time he learns Beaulieu is a righteous psychopath and fanatical chess player who kills drug-dealers, pedophiles and other bad people for a better world.

Weeks pass and Yannick remains a prisoner, though is otherwise not mistreated by Beaulieu. He tries to escape, but is recaptured by Beaulieu's daughter Michelle, who breaks his leg. As he has done nothing wrong, Beaulieu doesn't want to kill Yannick and eventually agrees to let him go if he wins a game of chess against him, Beaulieu having never lost a game in his life so far. They play chess constantly, but Yannick never wins, though he rattles Beaulieu by once managing a draw. After Beaulieu's wife and daughter finally stand up to Beaulieu, they free Yannick. But Yannick has gone mad sitting locked in the room playing chess games against Beaulieu and doesn't leave, believing that the only option to stop Beaulieu is to win against him.

In the final showdown the two play a chess game in the cellar, where Beaulieu has conserved all of his victims and placed them as pieces on a giant chessboard. During the game, Beaulieu's little stepdaughter enters the cellar and witnesses her dead mother placed as a piece on the chessboard. She is then shot accidentally by Beaulieu, which renders him catatonic. The police arrive, free Yannick and arrest Beaulieu. Four months later Yannick is still madly obsessed with the interrupted chess game, so thoroughly consumed by the thought of the final position that he alienates himself from his girlfriend.

Cast

Production
The film was filmed at Melrose Studios in Saint-Hubert, Québec, Canada.

Awards
Éric Tessier won for his script the Audience Award at the Gérardmer Film Festival and Joan-Patricia Parris was nominated for the Jutra Award for the best make-up.

Release
The film premiered on 9 October 2009 in Canada.

References

External links
 

2009 films
2009 psychological thriller films
2000s French-language films
Canadian horror thriller films
Canadian psychological drama films
Films based on horror novels
Films set in Quebec
2000s psychological drama films
Films shot in Quebec
Films directed by Éric Tessier
2009 drama films
French-language Canadian films
2000s Canadian films